ASCR may refer to:

 Academy of Sciences of the Czech Republic (renamed as Czech Academy of Sciences, however)
 Adult stem cell research
 AS Choisy-le-Roi, a French football club
 ASUS Smart Contrast Ratio, a vendor-specific rating for dynamic contrast ratio
 Advanced Scientific Computing Research, a program office at Office of Science